was a village located in Kitashitara District, Aichi Prefecture, Japan.

As of May 1, 2004, the village had an estimated population of 1,553 and a density of 29.3 persons per km2. The total area was 53.13 km2.

Geography
Tsugu was located at the extreme northeast corner of Aichi Prefecture, in an area of 1000-meter mountains. Some 90 percent of the village area was covered in mountains and forest.

History
Kamitsugu and Shimotsugu villages were created on April 1, 1889 within Kitashitara District, but were administered jointly from 1903 to 1922. On September 30, 1956 the two villages officially merged to form Tsugu Village.

On October 1, 2005, Tsugu was merged into the expanded town of Shitara, and has ceased to exist as an independent municipality.

External links
unofficial home page

Dissolved municipalities of Aichi Prefecture
Shitara, Aichi